The 2017–18 Hofstra Pride men's basketball team represents Hofstra University during the 2017–18 NCAA Division I men's basketball season. The Pride, led by fifth-year head coach Joe Mihalich, will play their home games at Mack Sports Complex in Hempstead, New York as members of the Colonial Athletic Association. They finished the season 19–12, 12–6 in CAA play to finish in third place. They lost in the first round of the CAA tournament to UNC Wilmington.

Previous season
The Pride finished the 2016–17 season 15–17, 7–11 in CAA play to finish in a tie for seventh place. They lost in the first round of the CAA tournament to Delaware.

Offseason

Departures

Incoming transfers

2017 recruiting class

Preseason 
In a poll of league coaches, media relations directors, and media members at the CAA's media day, the Pride were picked to finish in fourth place in the CAA. Junior guard Justin Wright-Foreman was named to the preseason All-CAA first team while senior forward Rokas Gustys was named to the second team.

Roster

Schedule and results

|-
!colspan=12 style=| Non-conference regular season
|-

|-
!colspan=12 style=| CAA regular season

|-
!colspan=12 style=| CAA tournament

Source

See also
2017–18 Hofstra Pride women's basketball team

References

Hofstra Pride men's basketball seasons
Hofstra